Bill "The Undertaker" Baker (born August 29, 1944) is a former defensive end who played in Canadian Football League.

Junior and college football
Bill Baker played junior football for the Regina Rams in 1963, and college football at Otterbein College, where he was a First Team All-Star for four years.

CFL career
Baker played in a total of 174 games over eleven seasons with the Saskatchewan Roughriders (1968–1973, 1977–1978) and BC Lions (1974–1976). He was a Division All-Star five times, and won the CFL's Most Outstanding Defensive Player Award in 1976 as a member of the Lions.

Saskatchewan 1960s
In 1968, Saskatchewan had the fewest points allowed in the CFL with 223, including teams in the Eastern division with two fewer games played, but lost in the Western conference final to the Calgary Stampeders. In 1969, the Roughrider defence allowed 261 points, second in the conference, and won the Western conference final, but the passing attack of the Russ Jackson-led Ottawa Rough Riders was too much for them in the 57th Grey Cup.

Saskatchewan 1970s: first time around
In 1970, the Saskatchewan defence dominated the league again with 206 points allowed, but could not beat Calgary in the Western conference final, or beat Calgary in the Western conference final in 1971. In 1972, the Roughriders beat the Winnipeg Blue Bombers in the Western conference final, but, despite limiting the Hamilton Tiger-Cats to just 13 points, lost the 60th Grey Cup game because of a weak offence. In the 1973 season, the Roughriders could not get by the Edmonton Eskimos in the Western conference final.

British Columbia
Baker had a 3-year stint with the BC Lions, less successful as a team than Saskatchewan during this period. In the 1974 season, BC lost to Saskatchewan in the semifinal. In the 1975 and 1976 seasons, the team could not reach the playoffs. Baker won the defensive player of the year award in 1976 despite BC's mediocre 336 points allowed and 5-9-2 record.

Saskatchewan 1970s: second time around
Baker ended his career with a 2-year stint with his former team, Saskatchewan, but neither in 1977 nor in 1978 did Saskatchewan make the playoffs. Thus, Baker's career ended on a losing note, his team finishing last in the Western conference with a record of 4-11-1.

Canadian Football Hall of Fame
Despite never having played on a Grey Cup winner, Baker was inducted to the Canadian Football Hall of Fame in 1994 and, in 2006, was listed at #43 on the TSN Top 50 CFL Players list. His credo was "your opponents are only as tough as you let them be." According to the Canadian Football Hall of Fame, "a Baker forearm to the head was greatly respected by opposing quarterbacks who came within range."

Saskatchewan 1980s: third time around
Bill Baker became general manager of the Saskatchewan Roughriders in 1987-1988.

1989: CFL president
When the CFL split its commissioner role into two positions after the departure of Douglas Mitchell, Baker became CFL President/Chief Operating Officer in 1989, with Roy McMurtry, Q.C. holding the position of Chairman/Chief Executive Officer. When Baker resigned, McMurtry continued as Chairman and CEO until Crump's appointment but did not serve as Acting Commissioner.

Video clips

References

1944 births
Living people
BC Lions players
Canadian football defensive linemen
Canadian Football Hall of Fame inductees
Canadian Football League commissioners
Canadian Football League Most Outstanding Defensive Player Award winners
Otterbein Cardinals football players
Sportspeople from Kindersley
Players of Canadian football from Manitoba
Saskatchewan Roughriders players